Tang-e Kabutari (also Romanized as Tang-e Kabūtarī) is a village in Derak Rural District, in the Central District of Shiraz County, Fars Province, Iran. At the 2006 census, its population was 42, in 9 families.

References 

Populated places in Shiraz County